Mimenicodes subunicolor is a species of beetle in the family Cerambycidae. It was described by Stephan von Breuning in 1973. It is known from New Caledonia.

References

Enicodini
Beetles described in 1973